The smoky grass mouse (Akodon fumeus) is a species of rodent in the family Cricetidae. It is found in Argentina, Bolivia and Peru.

References

Akodon
Mammals described in 1902
Taxa named by Oldfield Thomas
Taxonomy articles created by Polbot